Neelam Sanjeeva Reddy Stadium or as District College Stadium is a cricket ground in Anantapur, Andhra Pradesh, India.  Having originally been called the District College Stadium, it was later named after Neelam Sanjiva Reddy, the sixth President of India.

The ground first held a first-class match in 1964 when Andhra Pradesh played Madras in the 1963/64 Ranji Trophy.  The following first-class match held there in the same year saw the Rest of India play Bombay in the 1986/87 Ranji Trophy.  From 1964 to 1986, the ground held four further first-class matches, the last of which saw Andhra Prasdeh play Hyderabad.

References

External links
Neelam Sanjeeva Reddy Stadium at ESPNcricinfo
Neelam Sanjeeva Reddy Stadium at CricketArchive

Cricket grounds in Andhra Pradesh
Buildings and structures in Anantapur district
1964 establishments in Andhra Pradesh
Sports venues completed in 1964
20th-century architecture in India